Aliwal Araian is a village in Batala in Gurdaspur district of Punjab State, India. The village is administrated by Sarpanch an elected representative of the village.

Demography 

As of the 2011 Census of India, The village has a total number of 352 houses and the population of 1816 of which 983 are males while 833 are females according to the report published by Census India in 2011. The literacy rate of the village is 79.16%, highest than the state average of 75.84%. The population of children under the age of 6 years is 180 which is 9.91% of total population of the village, and child sex ratio is approximately 847 highr than the state average of 846.

See also
List of villages in India

References 

Villages in Gurdaspur district